The Raceair Skylite is an American ultralight aircraft that was designed by Ed Fisher and made available in the form of plans for amateur construction, by Raceair Designs.

The Skylite design was started in 1988 and the completed aircraft was first shown at Oshkosh in 1991.

It was also sold by Wings of Freedom, but by late 2019 the company website had been taken down and it is likely that production had ended.

Design and development
It features a strut-braced high wing, a single-seat, open cockpit, conventional landing gear and a single engine in tractor configuration. The design is intended to resemble the high-wing air racers of the 1930s.

The Skylite is constructed with a welded 4130 steel tube fuselage, with the wings built from riveted and gussetted aluminum tubing. The wing ribs are made from angled aluminum and have an  spacing between them. All surfaces are covered in 1.6 oz aircraft fabric finished with latex. Its  span wing is supported by "V" lift struts and jury struts and features full-span ailerons. The vertical stabilizer is highly swept back. The pilot is accommodated in a semi-enclosed cockpit with a windshield.

Due to its plans-built construction and complex design, only a small number of aircraft were completed before the plans were initially taken off the market. Today plans and kits are again available from Wings Of Freedom of Hubbard, Ohio as well as the newly resurrected Raceair Designs. Construction time is estimated as 750 hours.

Operational history
The design won Grand Champion Ultralight at AirVenture in 1991.

By 1998 the company reported that 300 kits and plans had been sold and 26 aircraft were completed and flying.

Specifications (Skylite)

References

External links

Official web site (Cloudbase Aviation)
Photo of a Skylite
All-aspect photos of a Skylite

1990s United States ultralight aircraft
Homebuilt aircraft
Single-engined tractor aircraft
Raceair Designs aircraft
Wings of Freedom aircraft